Tiny Toon Adventures: The Great Beanstalk (known as Tiny Toon Adventures: Buster and the Beanstalk in Europe) is the first Tiny Toon Adventures game released on the PlayStation.  It was developed by Terraglyph Interactive Studios and published by NewKidCo on October 27, 1998.

There is a game for Microsoft Windows by the name of Tiny Toon Adventures: Buster and the Beanstalk that is very similar to this game.

Gameplay
Inspired by the fairy story Jack and the Beanstalk, Plucky Duck and Buster Bunny have found the Great Beanstalk. The player takes control of Plucky Duck, who is following Buster Bunny as they climb the beanstalk and explore the areas above.

Development
The game was announced at E3 1998.

References

External links

1998 video games
PlayStation (console) games
PlayStation (console)-only games
Point-and-click adventure games
Video games based on Tiny Toon Adventures
Video games developed in the United States
NewKidCo games
Single-player video games